List table of the properties and districts — listed on the California Historical Landmarks — within Napa County, California. 

Note: Click the "Map of all coordinates" link to the right to view a Google map of all properties and districts with latitude and longitude coordinates in the table below.

Listings

|}

References

See also

List of California Historical Landmarks
National Register of Historic Places listings in Napa County, California

 

 
 
 
Buildings and structures in Napa County, California 
List of California Historical Landmarks
Protected areas of Napa County, California